Zariver is an abandoned village in the Vardenis Municipality of the Gegharkunik Province of Armenia.

References

External links 

Former populated places in Gegharkunik Province